Lutheran Evangelical Church or Evangelical Lutheran Church may refer to:

Lutheran Evangelical Church in Africa—Zambia Diocese
Evangelical Lutheran Church in America
Lutheran Church of Australia (1966 merger of Evangelical Lutheran Church of Australia and United Evangelical Lutheran Church of Australia)
Evangelical Lutheran Church of England
Evangelical Lutheran Church of Finland
Evangelical-Lutheran Church of Hanover
Evangelical Lutheran Church of Iceland, known as the Church of Iceland
Evangelical Lutheran Church in Italy
Evangelical Lutheran Church in Lithuania
Evangelical Lutheran Church in Malaysia
Evangelical Lutheran Church in Russia, Ukraine, Kazakhstan and Central Asia
Evangelical Lutheran Church of São Paulo
Evangelical-Lutheran Church in Württemberg